Looking Out is an album by the jazz pianist McCoy Tyner released on the Columbia label in 1982. It has performances by Tyner with Carlos Santana, Stanley Clarke, Gary Bartz, vocalist Phyllis Hyman and a string section.

Reception
The Allmusic review by Scott Yanow states "the music is quite forgettable. Tyner plays well and with as much passion as usual but one can clearly sense that not all of the musicians were recording the music at the same time for they rarely react to each other's presence. One of the great pianist's weaker efforts".   Album is currently out of print in the US and is only available as an import on CD.   "Senior Carlos" featuring Carlos Santana and "In Search Of My Heart" featuring Phyllis Hyman are considered to be the high points of an otherwise polarizing album.

Track listing
 "Love Surrounds Us Everywhere" - 5:15
 "Hannibal" (Lighterwood, Pasqua, Rekow, Santana) - 7:04
 "I'll Be Around" (Clarke, Tyner, Wilder) - 6:12
 "Señor Carlos" - 7:54
 "In Search of My Heart" - 7:07
 "Island Birdie" - 5:16
All compositions by McCoy Tyner except as indicated

Personnel
 McCoy Tyner: piano, synthesizer
 Gary Bartz: alto saxophone
 Carlos Santana: guitar
 Charles W. Johnson, Jr.: guitar
 Denzil Miller: synthesizer
 James W. Alexander: synthesizer
 Stanley Clarke: electric bass, double bass
 Buddy Williams: drums
 Ndugu Leon Chancler: drums
 Ignacio Berroa: percussion
 Jerry González: percussion
 Phyllis Hyman: vocals
 Unidentified string section and horn section

References

McCoy Tyner albums
1982 albums
Columbia Records albums